Muricodrupa fenestrata is a species of sea snail, a marine gastropod mollusk in the family Muricidae, the murex snails or rock snails.

Description
The shell size varies between 17 mm and 45 mm.

Distribution
This species occurs in the Red Sea, in the Indian Ocean off Madagascar, Tanzania and the south coast of South Africa and in the Indo-West Pacific.

References

 Houart R., Kilburn R.N. & Marais A.P. (2010) Muricidae. pp. 176–270, in: Marais A.P. & Seccombe A.D. (eds), Identification guide to the seashells of South Africa. Volume 1. Groenkloof: Centre for Molluscan Studies. 376 pp

Further reading 
 Dautzenberg Ph. (1929). Mollusques testaces marins de Madagascar. Faune des Colonies Francaises, Tome III.
 Emerson W. K. & D'Attilio A. (1981). "Remarks on Muricodrupa Iredale, 1918 (Muricidae: Thaidinae), with the description of a new species". The Nautilus 95(2): 77–82
 Spry J. F. (1961). "The sea shells of Dar es Salaam: Gastropods". Tanganyika Notes and Records 56.
 Branch G. M. et al. (2002). Two Oceans. 5th impression. David Philip, Cate Town & Johannesburg.

External links
 

Muricodrupa
Gastropods described in 1832